Spearhead Peak is located in the Teton Range, Caribou-Targhee National Forest in the U.S. state of Wyoming. The peak is situated near the head of Death Canyon and the Teton Crest Trail is immediately west of the peak.

References

Mountains of Wyoming
Mountains of Teton County, Wyoming